Sabse Bada Champion is a 2019 Indian Bhojpuri-language action romance drama film written and directed by Dhiraj Thakur and produced by Anil Kabra and Renuka Singh under banner of "India E-Commerce Ltd". It stars Ravi Kishan and Kanak Pandey in the lead role while Raju Singh Mahi, Kishan Rai, Monika Roy, Ayushi Tiwari, Brijesh Tripathi, Amit Shukla, Raj Kapoor Shahi, Heera Lal Yadav and others play supporting roles. Rakhi Sawant makes a special appearance in a item song, which making debut in Bhojpuri cinema.

Cast
Ravi Kishan
Kanak Pandey
Raju Singh Mahi
Brijesh Tripathi
Heera Lal Yadav
Ayushi Tiwari
Monika Roy
Kishan kumar Rai
Amit Shukla
Raj Kapoor Shahi
Rakhi Sawant as an item number song "Navratan Tel"
 Sambhavna Seth as special appearance in  item song

Music

The music of Sabse Bada Champion is composed by Madhukar Anand and Anuj Tiwari with lyrics penned by Anuj Tiwari. It is produced under the "Yashi Films".

References

2019 films
2010s Bhojpuri-language films